William Bast of Dartmouth, Devon, was an English politician.

Bast was a Member of Parliament for Dartmouth September 1388.

References

14th-century births
Year of death missing
English MPs September 1388
Members of the Parliament of England for Dartmouth